Lagascea is a genus of flowering plants in the family Asteraceae.  It occurs primarily in Mexico, but some species extend into Central America and one reaches north into the western United States.  One species, L. mollis, has been widely introduced to other localities around the tropics and subtropics.

Lagascea is a member of the same subtribe Helianthinae as the common sunflower, Helianthus annuus, but it looks different because it has heads that are reduced to have 1 (or 2) flowers, and are clustered into compound units that mimic heads and are sometimes called syncephalia.  The relationships of Lagascea are not well established, but the published work from molecular phylogenetic studies places it as the sister genus to Tithonia.  Two of the species are herbs, distinguished from each other by features of the heads, and the remaining species are shrubs and are distinguished primarily by vegetative features.

The genus is named after the Spanish botanist Mariano Lagasca (1776-1839).

 Species
 Lagascea agustifolia D.C. - Guanajuato, Guerrero, Jalisco, México State, Morelos, Zacatecas, Nayarit, Sinaloa
 Lagascea aurea Stuessy - Michoacán
 Lagascea decipiens Hemsl. - Arizona (Pima + Santa Cruz Counties), Mexico (from Sonora to Oaxaca)
 Lagascea helianthifolia H.B.K. - Mexico + Central America from Tamaulipas to Nicaragua
 Lagascea heteropappus Hemsl. - Guerrero, México State, Michoacán
 Lagascea mollis Cav. - Mexico + Central America 
 Lagascea palmeri (B. Rob.) B. Rob. - Michoacán, Colima
 Lagascea rigida (Cav.) Stuessy - Guerrero, México State, Morelos, Puebla, Distrito Federal

References

Heliantheae
Asteraceae genera
Flora of Mexico
Flora of Central America
Taxa named by Mariano Lagasca
Taxa named by Antonio José Cavanilles